My Fair Lady is a South Korean television series starring Heo Jung-eun in the title role, with Oh Ji-ho, Park Jin-hee and Oh Yoon-ah, based on the award-winning   screenplay by Jun Ho-sung. It aired every Wednesday and Thursday from November 16, 2016 to January 5, 2017 on KBS2 at 22:00 KST.

Synopsis
A story about a con-man (Oh Ji-ho) and his daughter (Heo Jung-eun) who suffers from Niemann–Pick disease

Cast

Main 
 Heo Jung-eun as Yoo Geum-bi 
 Oh Ji-ho as Mo Hwi-hul 
 Park Jin-hee as Go Kang-hee 
 Oh Yoon-ah as Yoo Joo-young

Supporting

People around Hwi-chul
 Seo Hyun-chul as Kong Gil-ho 
 Lee In-hye as Heo Jae-kyung
 Shin Soo-yeon as Eun-soo
 Lee Ji-hoon as Cha Chi-soo

People at Geum-bi's school
 Park Min-soo as Hwang Jae-ha 
 Son Sang-yeon as Jae-ha (17 years old)
 Kang Ji-woo as Hong Shil-ra 
 Im Hye-young as Kang Min-ah
 Kim Ki-yun as Goo Mi-ran

People around Kang-hee
 Kang Sung-jin as Go Joon-pil 
 Kim Do-hyun as Choi Jae-jin 
 Kim Nan-hwi as Kim Hee-young

Others
 Kim Dae-jong as Kim Woo-yun
 Gil Hae-yeon as Kim Young-ji
 Jung In-seo as So-hee
 Lee Jong-soo as Ma Sang-soo
 Jason Scott Nelson as Doctor (voice)
 Jung Eui-kap as Jo Sung-gap
 Lee Ho-chul as Choi Moo-guk
 Kim Tae-han as Bae Jong-won

Ratings

Awards and nominations

Adaptation
A Turkish adaptation titled Kızım ("My Daughter") was produced by Med Yapım and aired by TV8 for 34 episodes from September 19, 2018 to May 31, 2019. It starred Beren Gökyıldız as eight-year-old girl Öykü Tekin Göktürk and Buğra Gülsoy as her father Demir Göktürk.

References

External links
 
 
 

Korean Broadcasting System television dramas
2016 South Korean television series debuts
2017 South Korean television series endings
South Korean melodrama television series
Television series by Logos Film